Meru North District was an unconstitutionally created district of Kenya, located in that country's Eastern Province. In 1992, it was split from Meru District, along with Meru Central District, Meru South District (Nithi), and Tharaka District. Since the High Court's decision in September 2009, the territory of Meru North has been part of Meru County.

The area of Meru North District is home to the Ameru people, who are sometimes described as being related to other tribes living in the Mount Kenya region: the Kikuyu and Embu. The people are now predominantly Christian — Methodist, Presbyterian, Roman Catholic, and other denominations, reflecting the work of missionaries. There are minorities of Indian descent, who are mainly Hindus, and Arab descent, who are Muslims. There are also some resident Europeans, who are predominantly British in ancestry.

Meru is well known for its production of khat, known locally as miraa, which it supplies to the rest of the country's major towns. Because of the rich soils in the area, khat thrives and most of the residents benefit from its sale. Trading in this commodity is a boon to other vendors, for example it stimulates the sale of banana leaves to khat traders to protect the harvest from drying.

The district headquarters was in the town of Maua. There were four constituencies in the district: 
Igembe South Constituency
Igembe North Constituency
Tigania East Constituency
Tigania West Constituency

References

External links 
 Office for the Coordination of Humanitarian Affairs – Kenya AdminLevels 1-4 (.pdf)

 
Former districts of Kenya